The men's cruiserweight (86 kg/189.2 lbs) Low-Kick division at the W.A.K.O. European Championships 2006 in Skopje was the third heaviest of the male Low-Kick tournaments and involved nine fighters in total.  Each of the matches was three rounds of two minutes each and were fought under Low-Kick kickboxing rules.

Due to the fact there were too few contestants for a tournament fit for sixteen, seven of the participants had a bye through to the quarter final stage.  The tournament gold medal went to Kirill Ivanov from Russia who defeated Croatian Stipe Stipetic in the final by unanimous decision.  The bronze medal positions were taken by Dilian Slavov and Vladimir Djordjevic from Bulgaria and Serbia respectively.

Results

Key

See also
List of WAKO Amateur European Championships
List of WAKO Amateur World Championships
List of male kickboxers

References

External links
 WAKO World Association of Kickboxing Organizations Official Site

W.A.K.O. European Championships 2006 (Skopje)